This page is the discography of the Greek singer Panos Kiamos.

It consists of eighteen studio albums and twenty-eight singles, including "Thelo Na Se Xanado" which is Kiamos' biggest success.

Studio albums

Compilation albums

Singles

As lead artist

As featured artist

Other charted songs

Music videos 
1998: Ola Gia Senane Milane (Phonodisc/ Ria Records)
1998: Trelós Gia Séna (Phonodisc/ Ria Records)
1999: Den Eísai Móni (Music Box International)
2000: Gýrna Píso (Music Box International)
2000: Ti Théleis Kai Zitás Logariasmó (Music Box International)
2001: Érotas (Music Box International) (me Sofía Víka)
2002: Arketá (Music Box International)
2002: Tóra Pou Boró/Den Tha Fýgeis (Music Box International)
2003: Agápi Mou Megáli (Music Box International)
2004: Ótan Péftei To Skotádi (Music Box International)
2004: Sti Thessaloníki Tragoudó (Music Box International)
2005: Eísai Pantoú (Music Box International)
2005: San Tainía Paliá (Music Box International)
2005: Vres Lígo Chróno (Music Box International)
2006: Écho Ponései Gi' Aftín (Polydor)
2006: Áse Me Mia Nýchta Móno (Polydor)
2006: Anemothýella (Polydor)
2007: Sti Fotiá To Chéri Mou (Polydor)
2007: Gýrna Se Ména (Polydor)
2007: Tha Vgaíno, Tha Píno (Polydor)
2008: Chartoríchtra (Universal Music Greece)
2008: Os Ton Ouranó (Universal Music Greece)
2010: Sfýrixa... Ki Élixes (Universal Music Greece)
2011: Olokaínourgios (Universal Music Greece)
2011: Apó Deftéra (Universal Music Greece)
2012: Krýstalla (Universal Music Greece)
2012: To Aíma Mou Píso (Universal Music Greece)
2012: Fotiá Me Fotiá (Universal Music Greece)
2012: Níkises Páli (Universal Music Greece)
2013: Den Thélo Epafí (Cobalt Music)
2013: De Mou Pernás (Cobalt Music)
2014: Dyo Mátia Ble (Cobalt Music) (me Goin' Through)
2015: Apó Astéri Se Astéri (Cobalt Music)
2015: Pós Tha Ti Vgálo (Cobalt Music)
2017: Alloú Esý (Cobalt Music)
2018: Chartaetós (Cobalt Music)
2018: Thélo Na Se Xanadó (Cobalt Music) (me Super Sako & Bo)
2018: Aftó Na To Thymásai (Cobalt Music)

References

Kiamos, Panos